Dibrova may refer to the following places in Ukraine:
 Dibrova, Saranchuky rural hromada, Ternopil Raion, Ternopil Oblast
 Dibrova, Saranchuky Hromada, Ternopil Raion
 Dibrova, Zbarazh Hromada, Ternopil Raion
 Dibrova, Zhytomyr Oblast
 Dibrova, Sievierodonetsk Raion, Luhansk Oblast
 Dibrova, Vyshhorod Raion, Kyiv Oblast